East Belmont is a historic farm and national historic district located near Keswick, Albemarle County, Virginia.  The district encompasses 3 contributing buildings, 1 contributing site, and 1 contributing structure.  The original house, now the rear ell, was built about 1811–1814, and is a two-story, three bay, gable roofed frame structure.  In 1834, a two-story, five-bay Federal style brick structure was added as the main house. A one-story, glass sunroom was added in the 1960s. The front facade features a two-story, pedimented portico. Also on the property are a contributing 19th-century corncrib, early 20th-century stone and frame barn, and an early 20th-century henhouse.

It was added to the National Register of Historic Places in 1999.

See also
 John Rogers, first owner of East Belmont
 Belmont Plantation (Albemarle County, Virginia), the portion of the Belmont estate that was split in 1811, creating East Belmont

References

Farms on the National Register of Historic Places in Virginia
Historic districts on the National Register of Historic Places in Virginia
Houses completed in 1834
Houses in Albemarle County, Virginia
National Register of Historic Places in Albemarle County, Virginia